Trifurcula squamatella is a moth of the family Nepticulidae. It was described by Henry Tibbats Stainton in 1849. It is found in most of Europe.

The wingspan is 7.8–9.8 mm for males and 8.4–10 mm for females.

The larvae probably mine the bark of broom.

References

External links
Taxonomy and distribution of Trifurcula squamatella Stainton sp.rev., a senior synonym of T. maxima Klimesch (Lepidoptera: Nepticulidae)

Nepticulidae
Moths of Europe
Moths described in 1849